Jude Michael Boyd (born 17 October 2002) is an English footballer who plays as a midfielder for San Jose State Spartans.

Career
Born in Epsom, Surrey, Boyd moved to Cornwall at a young age. Boyd played youth football for Cornish clubs Perranwell and St Day, before joining Plymouth Argyle at the age of 14. On 3 September 2019, Boyd made his debut for Plymouth in a 1–1 EFL Trophy draw against Bristol Rovers. He was released by Plymouth in summer 2020.

He joined Mousehole in summer 2020 after being released by Plymouth.

References

2002 births
Living people
Sportspeople from Epsom
English footballers
Association football midfielders
Plymouth Argyle F.C. players
Mousehole A.F.C. players